The Commander-in-Chief of India, Lord Kitchener carried out a reform of the British Indian Army in 1903. These reforms were intended to improve the Army, which had been formed from the separate Bengal, Bombay and Madras presidency armies in 1895 to be replaced by the Bengal, Bombay, Madras and Punjab commands. The localisation of regiments was abolished, and in future every regiment was to have the opportunity of experiencing service on the Frontier. A new method of numbering and designating regiments was introduced. The renumbering went as follows:
Bengal regiments retained their existing numbers.
Punjab regiments, less the 5th Gurkhas, were numbered consecutively, adding 50, so that, for example, the 4th Sikh Infantry and the 1st Punjab Infantry became 54th and 55th.
The Guides remained unnumbered.
Madras regiments added 60 and, since over the years a number of them had been increasingly recruited in the Punjab, this was recognised in their titles, the 30th Madras, for example, becoming the 90th Punjabis.
The Hyderabad Contingent regiments were brought into the Line as 94th to 99th.
The Bombay regiments added 100, so that the 1st Bombay Grenadiers became the 101st Grenadiers, and so on.

By 1903, the total strength of the Indian Army was 240,000 men. They served in 39 cavalry regiments, 135 infantry battalions (including 17 Gurkha), a joint cavalry-infantry unit the Corps of Guides, three sapper regiments and 12 mountain artillery batteries. In addition to the regular Indian Army, the armies of the Princely states, and regiments of the Auxiliary force (European volunteers) could also be called on to assist in an emergency. The Princely states had 22,613 men in 20 cavalry regiments and 14 infantry battalions. The Auxiliary force could field another 40,000 men in 11 regiments of horse and 42 volunteer infantry battalions. Also available were the Frontier Militia and the Military Police, which could field 34,000 men between them.

Cavalry

Bodyguard troops
Governor-General's Bodyguard
Governor's Bodyguard, Madras
Governor's Bodyguard, Bombay

Former Bengal Regiments
1st Duke of York's Own Lancers (Skinner's Horse)
2nd Lancers (Gardner's Horse)
3rd Skinner's Horse
4th Lancers - (4th Cavalry in 1904)
5th Cavalry
6th Prince of Wales's Cavalry - (6th King Edward's Own Cavalry in 1906)
7th Lancers - (7th Hariana Lancers in 1904)
8th Lancers - (8th Cavalry in 1904)
9th Hodson's Horse
10th Duke of Cambridge's Own Lancers (Hodson's Horse)
11th Prince of Wales's Own Lancers - (11th Prince of Wales's Own Lancers (Probyn's Horse) in 1904)
12th Cavalry
13th Duke of Connaught's Own Lancers (Watson's Horse)
14th Murray's Jat Lancers
15th Lancers (Cureton's Multanis)
16th Cavalry
17th Cavalry
18th Tiwana Lancers
19th Lancers (Fane's Horse)
20th Deccan Horse - former Hyderabad regiment

Former Punjab Regiments
21st Prince Albert Victor's Own Cavalry (Frontier Force) - (21st Prince Albert Victor's Own Cavalry (Frontier Force) (Daly's Horse) in 1904)
22nd Cavalry (Frontier Force) - (22nd Sam Browne's Cavalry (Frontier Force) in 1904)
23rd Cavalry (Frontier Force)
25th Cavalry (Frontier Force)

Former Madras regiments
26th Light Cavalry
27th Light Cavalry
28th Light Cavalry

Former Hyderabad regiments
29th Lancers (Deccan Horse)
30th Lancers (Gordon's Horse)

Former Bombay regiments
31st Duke of Connaught's Own Lancers
32nd Lancers
33rd Queen's Own Light Cavalry
34th Prince Albert Victor's Own Poona Horse
35th Scinde Horse
36th Jacob's Horse
37th Lancers (Baluch Horse)

Former Local Corps
38th Central India Horse
39th central horse

Cavalry and Infantry
Queen's Own Corps of Guides

Infantry

Former Thiyyar Regiments
Thiyyar Regiment

Former Bengal Regiments
1st Brahmans
2nd (Queen's Own) Regiment of Rajput Light Infantry
3rd Brahmans
4th Prince Albert Victor's Rajputs
5th Light Infantry
6th Jat Light Infantry
7th (Duke of Connaught's Own) Rajputs
8th Rajputs
9th Bhopal Infantry - former Local Corps
10th Jats
11th Rajputs
12th Pioneers (The Kelat-i-Ghilzie Regiment)
13th Rajputs (The Shekhawati Regiment)
14th Ferozepore Sikhs
15th Ludhiana Sikhs
16th Rajputs (The Lucknow Regiment)
17th Infantry (The Loyal Regiment)
18th Infantry
19th Punjabis
20th Duke of Cambridge's Own Punjabis - (20th Duke of Cambridge's Own Infantry (Brownlow's Punjabis) in 1904)
21st Punjabis
22nd Punjabis
23rd Sikh Pioneers

25th Punjabis
26th Punjabis
27th Punjabis
28th Punjabis
29th Punjabis
30th Punjabis
31st Punjabis
32nd Sikh Pioneers
33rd Punjabis
34th Sikh Pioneers
35th Sikhs
36th Sikhs
37th Dogras
38th Dogras
39th Garhwal Rifles
1st Battalion
2nd Battalion
40th Pathans
41st Dogras
42nd Deoli Regiment - former Rajputana Local Corps
43rd Erinpura Regiment - former Rajputana Local Corps
44th Merwara Infantry - former Rajputana Local Corps
45th Rattray's Sikhs
46th Punjabis
47th Sikhs
48th Pioneers

Former Punjab Regiments
51st Sikhs (Frontier Force)
52nd Sikhs (Frontier Force)
53rd Sikhs (Frontier Force)
54th Sikhs (Frontier Force)
55th Coke's Rifles (Frontier Force)
56th Infantry (Frontier Force) - (56th Punjabi Rifles (Frontier Force) in 1906)
57th Wilde's Rifles (Frontier Force)Sainis of Haryana
58th Vaughan's Rifles (Frontier Force)Sainis and Mauryas of Haryana
59th Scinde Rifles (Frontier Force)

Former Madras Regiments
61st Pioneers
62nd Punjabis
63rd Palamcottah Light Infantry
64th Pioneers
65th Carnatic Infantry (Disbanded 1904)
66th Punjabis
67th Punjabis
69th Punjabis
71st Coorg Rifles (Disbanded 1904)
72nd Punjabis
73rd Carnatic Infantry
74th Punjabis
75th Carnatic Infantry
76th Punjabis
77th Moplah Rifles (Disbanded 1907)
78th Moplah Rifles (Disbanded 1907)
79th Carnatic Infantry
80th Carnatic Infantry
81st Pioneers
82nd Punjabis
83rd Wallajahbad Light Infantry
84th Punjabis
86th Carnatic Infantry
87th Punjabis
88th Carnatic Infantry
89th Punjabis
90th Punjabis
91st Punjabis (Light Infantry)
92nd Punjabis
93rd Burma Infantry

Former Hyderabad Regiments
94th Russell's Infantry
95th Russell's Infantry
96th Berar Infantry
97th Deccan Infantry
98th Infantry
99th Deccan Infantry

Former Bombay Regiments
101st Grenadiers
102nd Prince of Wales's Own Grenadiers
103rd Mahratta Light Infantry
104th Wellesley's Rifles
105th Mahratta Light Infantry
107th Pioneers
108th Infantry
109th Infantry
110th Mahratta Light Infantry
112th Infantry
113th Infantry
114th Mahrattas
116th Mahrattas
117th Mahrattas
119th Infantry (The Mooltan Regiment)
120th Rajputana Infantry
121st Pioneers
122nd Rajputana Infantry
123rd Outram's Rifles
124th Duchess of Connaught's Own Baluchistan Infantry
125th Napier's Rifles
126th Baluchistan Infantry
127th Baluch Light Infantry
128th Pioneers
129th Duke of Connaught's Own Baluchis
130th Baluchis

Gurkha Line
(mostly former Bengal Regiments)
1st Gurkha Rifles (The Malaun Regiment)
1st Battalion
2nd Battalion
2nd (the Prince of Wales's Own) Gúrkha Rifles (the Sirmoor Rifles)
1st Battalion
2nd Battalion
3rd Gurkha Rifles
1st Battalion
2nd Battalion
4th Gurkha Rifles
1st Battalion
2nd Battalion
5th Gurkha Rifles (Frontier Force) - former  25th Native Punjab Infantry
1st Battalion
2nd Battalion
6th Gurkha Rifles
1st Battalion
2nd battalion (Raised in 1904) 
7th Gurkha Rifles
1st Battalion (Became 2nd/8th Gurkha Rifles in 1907.)
(2nd battalion raised 1907)
8th Gurkha Rifles
1st Battalion
(2nd battalion formed in 1907 from the 7th Gurkha Rifles)
9th Gurkha Rifles
1st Battalion
2nd Battalion (Raised in 1904)
10th Gurkha Rifles - former Madras Regiment
1st Battalion
2nd Battalion raised 1903 (Became 1st/7th Gurkha Rifles 1907. New 2nd/10th Battalion raised 1908.)

Support Arms

Indian Mountain Artillery
21st Kohat Mountain Battery (Frontier Force)
22nd Derajat Mountain Battery (Frontier Force)
23rd Peshawar Mountain Battery (Frontier Force)
24th Hazara Mountain Battery (Frontier Force)
25th Mountain Battery
26th Jacob's Mountain Battery
27th Mountain Battery
28th Mountain Battery
29th Mountain Battery
30th Mountain Battery
31st Mountain Battery (Raised 1907)
32nd Mountain Battery (Raised 1907)
The Frontier Garrison Artillery

Engineers
1st Sappers and Miners
2nd Queen's Own Sappers and Miners
3rd Sappers and Miners
Indian Submarine Mining Corps

Services

Army Bearer Corps
 No.22 Company
 No.23 Company
Army Clothing Department
Army Hospital Corps
 No.17 Company
 No.18 Company
Army Remount Department
Army Veterinary Service
Indian Medical Department
Indian Medical Service
Indian Ordnance Department
Supply and Transport Corps

Imperial Service Troops

Alwar Lancers
Alwar Infantry
Bahawalpur Mounted Rifles and Camel Transport Corps
Bikaner Camel Corps
Bikaner Light Infantry
Gwalior Lancers
Gwalior Infantry
Gwalior Transport Corps
Hyderabad Lancers
Jaipur Transport Corps
Jind Infantry
Jodhpur Lancers
Kapurthala Infantry
Kashmir Artillery
No. 1 Mountain Battery
No. 2 Mountain Battery
Kashmir Infantry
Kashmir Rifles
Malerkotla Sappers
Mysore Infantry
Mysore Lancers
Mysore Horse
Mysore Transport Corps
Nabha Infantry
Patiala Lancers
Patiala Infantry
Sirmoor Sappers

Volunteer Corps

Cavalry

Allahabad Light Horse
Assam Valley Light Horse
Bihar Light Horse
Bombay Light Horse
Calcutta Light Horse
Cawnpore Light Horse
Chota Nagpur Mounted Rifles
Ghazipur Light Horse
Gorakhpur Light Horse
Northern Bengal Mounted Rifles
Oudh Light Horse
Punjab Light Horse
Surma Valley Light Horse
United Provinces Light Horse formed 1904 by amalgamating the Allahabad, Cawnpore, Ghazipur, Gorakhpur, & Oudh Light Horse.

Artillery

Bombay Volunteer Artillery
Calcutta Naval Artillery Volunteers
Cossipore Artillery Volunteers
Karachi Artillery Volunteers
Madras Artillery Volunteers
Moulmein Volunteer Artillery Corps
Rangoon Port Defence Volunteers

Engineers
Calcutta Company
Bombay Company
Karachi Company

Infantry

Agra Volunteer Rifle Corps
Allahabad Volunteer Rifle Corps
Assam Bengal Railway Volunteer Rifles
Bangalore Rifle Volunteers
Bengal and North Western Railway Volunteer Corps
Bengal Nagpur Railway Volunteer Rifle Corps
Berar Volunteer Rifle Corps
Bombay, Baroda and Central India Railway Volunteer Corps
Bombay Volunteer Rifles Corps
Burma Railways Volunteers Corps
Calcutta Volunteer Rifles
1st Battalion
2nd (Presidency) Battalion
3rd (Cadet) Battalion
Cawnpore Volunteer Rifle Corps
Coorg and Mysore Rifles
East Coast Volunteer Rifles
East Indian Railway Volunteer Rifle Corps
Eastern Bengal Volunteer Rifles
Eastern Bengal State Railway Volunteer Rifle Corps
Great Indian Pensinula Railway Volunteer Corps
1st Battalion
2nd Battalion - former Midland Railway Volunteer Corps
Hyderabad Volunteer Rifle Corps
Kolar Gold Fields Battalion
Lucknow Volunteer Rifle Corps
Madras Railway Volunteers
Madras Volunteer Guards
Malabar Volunteer Rifles
Moulmein Volunteer Rifle Corps
Mussoorie Volunteer Rifle Corps
Nagpur Volunteer Rifles
Naini Tal Volunteer Rifle Corps
Nilgiri Volunteer Rifles
North Western Railway Volunteer Rifles
Oudh and Rohilkhand Railway Battalion
Poona Volunteer Rifles
Punjab Volunteer Rfle Corps
Rangoon Volunteer Rifle Corps
Shillong Volunteer Rifles
Simla Volunteer Rifles
Sind Volunteer Rifle Corps
South Andaman Volunteer Rifles Corps
South Indian Railway Volunteer Rifles Corps
Southern Mahratta Railway Rifle Corps
Upper Burma Volunteer Rifles

Frontier Corps and Para-Military Units

North-West Frontier and Baluchistan
Chitral Scouts
Frontier Constabulary
Khyber Rifles
Kurram Militia
North Waziristan Militia
South Waziristan Militia
Mekran Levy Corps
Zhob Levy Corps

North-East Frontier and Burma

Assam Military Police
Burma Military Police

Units formed in World War I

Cavalry
40th Indian Cavalry Regiment
41st Indian Cavalry Regiment
42nd Indian Cavalry Regiment
43rd Indian Cavalry Regiment
44th Indian Cavalry Regiment
45th Indian Cavalry Regiment
46th Indian Cavalry Regiment

Artillery
33rd (Reserve) Mountain Battery
34th (Reserve) Mountain Battery
35th (Reserve) Mountain Battery
39th (Reserve) Mountain Battery

Infantry
49th Bengalis
1st Battalion, 50th Kumaon Rifles
2nd Battalion, 50th Kumaon Rifles
1st Battalion, 70th Burma Rifles
2nd Battalion, 70th Burma Rifles
3rd Battalion, 70th Burma Rifles
4th Battalion, 70th Burma Rifles
71st Punjabis
85th Burman Rifles
111th Mahars
1st Battalion, 131st United Provinces Regiment
2nd Battalion, 131st United Provinces Regiment
1st Battalion, 132nd (Punjab Police) Regiment renamed 3rd Battalion, 30th Punjabis
2nd Battalion, 132nd (Punjab Police) Regiment renamed 4th Battalion, 30th Punjabis
133rd Regiment
140th Patiala Regiment
141st Bikanir Infantry
142nd Jodhpur Infantry
143rd Narsingh (Dholpur) Infantry
144th Bharatpur Infantry
145th Alwar (Jai Paltan) Infantry
1st Battalion, 150th Infantry
2nd Battalion, 150th Infantry
3rd Battalion, 150th Infantry
1st Battalion, 151st Sikh Infantry
2nd Battalion, 151st Sikh Infantry
3rd Battalion, 151st Punjabi Rifles
1st Battalion, 152nd Punjabis
2nd Battalion, 152nd Punjabis
3rd Battalion, 152nd Punjabis
1st Battalion, 153rd Punjabis
2nd Battalion, 153rd Punjabis
3rd Battalion, 153rd Rifles
1st Battalion, 154th Infantry
2nd Battalion, 154th Infantry
3rd Battalion, 154th Infantry
1st Battalion, 155th Pioneers
2nd Battalion, 155th Pioneers
1st Battalion, 156th Infantry
1st Battalion, 11th Gurkha Rifles
2nd Battalion, 11th Gurkha Rifles
3rd Battalion, 11th Gurkha Rifles
4th Battalion, 11th Gurkha Rifles

Paramilitary
Mohmand Militia
Sistan Levy Corps

See also
Kitchener Reforms
List of regiments of the Indian Army (1922)
List of regiments of the Indian Army
Thiyyar Regiment

Footnotes

References

Gaylor, John. Sons of John Company - The Indian and Pakistan Armies 1903-91. Parapress. Tunbridge Wells, Kent, 1996. .
Jackson, Maj. Donovan. India's Army. Sampson Low. London, 1940.

The Indian Army List October 1903. Army Headquarters, India. Calcutta, 1903.
The Indian Army List October 1904. Army Headquarters, India. Calcutta, 1904.
The Quarterly Indian Army List January 1919. Army Headquarters, India. Calcutta, 1919.
The Third Afghan War 1919 Official Account. Army Headquarters, India. Calcutta, 1926.

Online
 http://www.britishempire.co.uk/forces/armyunits/armyunit.htm

Regiments